This is an incomplete list of the paintings by the French Impressionist artist Gustave Caillebotte. Of independent means, Caillebotte was not obliged to sell his paintings to make a living, but nevertheless produced over 400 canvasses.

The catalog numbers of the works are as listed in the Catalogue Raisonné of the Wilderstein Institute.

1870–1878 (Yerres)

1879–1881 (Paris)

1881–1894 (Paris and Petit Gennevilliers)

References

Caillebotte, Gustave
Paintings by Gustave Caillebotte